Ordu Ethnographical Museum is a museum in Ordu, Turkey.

Location and history 
The museum is located in the city of Ordu on Taşocak street. The museum building is a historical building known as Paşaoğlu Mansion. A notable piece of civil architecture, it was built in 1896. In 1982, it was expropriated by the Ministry of Culture. Following a 4 years restoration, it was opened on 18 November 1987 as a museum.

The exhibits
The ground floor of the museum is reserved for administrative offices. The main ethnographic exhibits are on the first floor. Although the museum is an ethnographic museum, there are also some archaeological items and coins in the exhibits. The upper floor reflects the every day life of Ordu citizens with mannequins. The number of items in the exhibit is 1528 ethnographic items, 180 archaeological items, 1252 coins, 26 historical stamps, and 21 handwritten manuscripts.

References

Ethnographic museums in Turkey
1987 establishments in Turkey
Museums established in 1987
Museums in Ordu Province